Etoxeridine (Carbetidine, Atenos) is a 4-phenylpiperidine derivative that is related to the clinically used opioid analgesic drug pethidine (meperidine).

Etoxeridine was developed in the 1950s and investigated for use in surgical anesthesia, however it was never commercialized and is not currently used in medicine. As with other opioids which were not in clinical use during the drafting of the Controlled Substances Act, it is categorized as a Schedule I narcotic.

References 

Synthetic opioids
4-Phenylpiperidines
Primary alcohols
Ethers
Mu-opioid receptor agonists
Ethyl esters